During the 1982–83 English football season, Everton F.C. competed in the Football League First Division. They finished 7th in the table with 64 points.

Final league table

Results

Football League First Division

FA Cup

League Cup

Squad

References

1982-83
Everton
Everton F.C. season